Scythris curlettii is a moth of the family Scythrididae. It was described by Bengt Å. Bengtsson in 1997. It is found in Egypt, Iran, the Palestinian territories and Tunisia.

References

curlettii
Moths described in 1997